A Monstrous Psychedelic Bubble Exploding in Your Mind: Volume 2 is a 2009 compilation album with selections by the Amorphous Androgynous; it was released on CD in September 2009. It is an extensive compilation mix album featuring a wide variety of artists, selected and mixed by the duo.  Pagan Love Vibrations is the second in the series, following on from the successful first volume Cosmic Space Music and focusses on the band's psychedelic side, featuring everything from 1960s pop to film scores and modern psychedelia.

Noel Gallagher of the band Oasis spoke very highly of the first album and got into contact with Gaz Cobain after hearing this record and asked him if the Amorphous Androgynous would remix the Oasis single "Falling Down" which is also included on this album.

Track listing

Disc 1
Dungen – Satt Att Se (Instrumental)
Friends Of Dean Martinez – Dusk
Sunforest – Magician in the Mountain
Ed Askew – Love Is Everyone
Bo Diddley – Elephant Man
The Transpersonals – Silver Star
Electroid 2000 – Moogsters Revenge
Dan Sebesky – Guru-vin
Cranium Pie – Madman Running Through The Fields
Circulus – Orpheus
David Holmes – What R We Stealing
Dzyan – Naga Raga
US69 – 2069 A Spaced Oddity
Jean Claude Vannier – Les Gardes Volent Au Secours Du Roi
Faust – Just A Second (Starts Like That!)
Ultimate Spinach – (Ballad Of) The Hip Death Goddess
Focus – Anonymous II
Oasis – Falling Down (Monst. Psychedelic Bubble Mix Part 4)
Sohail Rana – Soul Sitars
Pentangle – Pentangling
Brightblack Morning Light – Another Reclamation

Disc 2
Melanie – Lay Down (Candles in the Rain)
Holy Fuck – The Pulse
July – The Way
Cozy Powell – So You Want To Be A Drummer
Animal Collective – Grass
Grover Washington Jr. – Masterpiece
Günter Kallmann Chor – Daydream
Richard Harris/ Kahlil Gibran-Trilogy from "The Prophet"
Amorphous Androgynous – Elysian Feels
Ananda Shankar – Exploration
Mort Garson – Killing of the Witch
Comus – Diana
Hawkwind – Adjust Me
Rocking Horse People – Lost in the Haze
Shogun Kunitoki – Mulberg
John Williams – Raga Vilasakhani Todi
Jazz Q/Martin Kratochvíl – Toledo
The Edgar Winter Group – Frankenstein
Turzi – Afghanistan
The Settlers – The Lightning Tree
Amorphous Androgynous – The Onion
Pearls Before Swine – Oh Dear (Miss Morse)
Amorphous Androgynous – High Tide on the Sea Of Flesh

Crew
Artwork – amorphik arts
Mixed, Compiled by – Amorphous Androgynous

References

External links
 A Monstrous Psychedelic Bubble at MySpace

The Future Sound of London compilation albums
2009 compilation albums